Eripurakarai is a village in the Pattukkottai taluk of Thanjavur district, Tamil Nadu, India.

Demographics 

As per the 2001 census, Eripurakarai had a total population of 3437 with 1651 males and 1786 females. The sex ratio was 1082. The literacy rate was 67.96.

References 

 

Villages in Thanjavur district